Barbus massaensis is a doubtfully distinct ray-finned fish species in the family Cyprinidae. It is found only in Morocco.

Its natural habitat is freshwater springs.  It is not considered a threatened species by the IUCN.

The taxonomy and systematics of the Maghreb barbs are subject to considerable dispute. Some authors consider B. massaensis a distinct species, while others include it in the Algerian barb (B. callensis).

References

M
Endemic fauna of Morocco
Fish described in 1922
Taxonomy articles created by Polbot
Taxobox binomials not recognized by IUCN